In mathematics, an integer matrix is a matrix whose entries are all integers. Examples include  binary matrices, the zero matrix, the matrix of ones, the identity matrix, and the adjacency matrices used in graph theory, amongst many others. Integer matrices find frequent application in combinatorics.

Examples
    and     
are both examples of integer matrices.

Properties
Invertibility of integer matrices is in general more numerically stable than that of non-integer matrices. The determinant of an integer matrix is itself an integer, thus the numerically smallest possible magnitude of the determinant of an invertible integer matrix is one, hence where inverses exist they do not become excessively large (see condition number). Theorems from matrix theory that infer properties from determinants thus avoid the traps induced by ill conditioned (nearly zero determinant) real or floating point valued matrices.

Integer matrices of determinant  form the group , which has far-reaching applications in arithmetic and geometry. For , it is closely related to the modular group.

The intersection of the integer matrices with the orthogonal group is the group of signed permutation matrices.

The characteristic polynomial of an integer matrix has integer coefficients. Since the eigenvalues of a matrix are the roots of this polynomial, the eigenvalues of an integer matrix are algebraic integers. In dimension less than 5, they can thus be expressed by radicals involving integers.

Integer matrices are sometimes called integral matrices, although this use is discouraged.

See also
GCD matrix
Unimodular matrix
Wilson matrix

External links

Integer Matrix at MathWorld

Matrices